Melvin Platje (born 16 December 1988 in Naarden) is a Dutch professional footballer who plays as a forward.

Career

Early career
Before joining FC Volendam, Platje played in the youth departments of FC Omniworld and SV Huizen. He later moved to the FC Volendam youth system, and Platje joined the professional ranks at the club in the summer of 2007. Platje made his first team debut on 24 August 2007, when he came on as a 68th-minute substitute for Jack Tuyp in an Eerste Divisie match against FC Zwolle. In the 2008–09 Eredivisie season, Platje became known as a super sub for coming on as a substitute and scoring many vital goals in the minutes he played.  In his last season with Volendam in the Eerste Divisie, Platje recorded 4 appearances and netted 5 goals. During the 2011 summer transfer window, Platje was transferred from Volendam to NEC on a free transfer. He made his debut for the club on 6 August 2011, starting in their draw 2–2 draw with Heerenveen.
In his second game for the club, Platje scored a nine-minute second-half brace against Excelsior to give his club a 2–0 win.  The win moved NEC up to fifth spot in the Eredivisie league table.

Neftchi Baku
In July 2013, Platje signed a lucrative one-year contract with Neftchi Baku in the Azerbaijan Premier League, but after failing to make an impact in Azerbaijan, Platje moved to Kalmar on loan for the remainder of his contract.

VVV Venlo
On 3 September, Platje signed a deal with Dutch Eerste Divisie side VVV-Venlo.

Lommel United
On 14 February 2017 he joined Belgian Second division club Lommel United till the end of the season.

Bali United
On 29 June 2018, he joined Indonesian Liga 1 club, Bali United. Platje made his Bali United debut on 11 July 2018 in a Liga 1 match against PSM Makassar in a 2–0 home win. He scored his first league goal on 17 July 2018. It was the first goal in a 0–2 victory against Persija Jakarta in the Liga 1. Platje was chosen as the 2019 Liga 1 best player in September. One of the roles of this special appearance was arguably done by Platje. he was able to get involved in three of the six goals scored by the players of Bali United this September. He scored two goals and one assist for Tridatu Warriors. On 13 August, he scored his first international brace in a temporary score 0–2 over Singapore Premier League club Tampines Rovers, after in the 43rd minute  Tampines's player Boris Kopitovic made his goal. Until the first half is over, score 1–2. Until the match is over. Bali United won 3–5 over Tampines Rovers through extra time and qualify for the preliminary round 2 in the 2020 AFC Champions League and will face Melbourne Victory on 21 January 2020.

Career statistics

Notes
1Includes other competitive competitions, including the Azerbaijan Supercup

Honours

Club 
FC Volendam
 Eerste Divisie: 2007–08
Hansa Rostock
 Mecklenburg-Vorpommern Cup: 2015–16
Bali United
 Liga 1: 2019

References

External links
Melvin Platje at VI.nl

 Melvin Platje Interview (1)
 Melvin Platje Interview (2)

1988 births
Living people
Dutch footballers
Dutch expatriate footballers
FC Volendam players
NEC Nijmegen players
VVV-Venlo players
SC Telstar players
De Graafschap players
Eredivisie players
Eerste Divisie players
People from Naarden
Ligue 2 players
Stade Brestois 29 players
3. Liga players
FC Hansa Rostock players
Lommel S.K. players
Challenger Pro League players
Association football forwards
Neftçi PFK players
Azerbaijan Premier League players
Bhayangkara F.C. players
Bali United F.C. players
Liga 1 (Indonesia) players
Kalmar FF players
Allsvenskan players
Expatriate footballers in France
Expatriate footballers in Azerbaijan
Expatriate footballers in Belgium
Expatriate footballers in Sweden
Expatriate footballers in Indonesia
Expatriate footballers in Germany
SDO Bussum players
Footballers from North Holland
Dutch expatriate sportspeople in Germany
Dutch expatriate sportspeople in Belgium
Dutch expatriate sportspeople in Indonesia
Dutch expatriate sportspeople in Sweden
Dutch expatriate sportspeople in Azerbaijan
Dutch expatriate sportspeople in Belarus